Radio Silence may refer to:

 Radio silence, a status in telecommunications
 Radio Silence Productions, a trio of filmmakers based in Los Angeles

Music
 Radio Silence (band), a Jamiroquai side project
 Radio Silence (Blue Peter album), 1980
 Radio Silence (Boris Grebenshchikov album), 1989, or the title song
 Radio Silence (Talib Kweli album), 2017
 "Radio Silence", a song by Thomas Dolby from The Golden Age of Wireless
 Radio Silence (James Blake song), from the 2016 album The Colour in Anything
 Radio Silence (Gretta Ray song), from the 2018 EP Here and Now

Other uses
 Radio Silence, a 2016 novel by Alice Oseman